Marc Moulin (16 August 1942 – 26 September 2008) was a Belgian musician and journalist (print, radio, TV). In the early-mid seventies, he was the leader of the jazz-rock group Placebo (not to be confused with the English rock band with the same name). He went on to become a member of the avant-rock band Aksak Maboul in 1977 and also formed the pop group Telex in 1978. Moulin was one of Belgium's jazz legends, making jazz-influenced records for over 30 years.

Biography 
Marc Moulin was born in Ixelles, Brussels, in 1942 and was the son of Léo Moulin, a sociologist and writer, and Jeanine Moulin, a Belgian poet and literary critic. Moulin began his career in the 1960s playing the piano throughout Europe and in 1961 won the Bobby Jaspar trophy for Best Soloist at the Comblain-la-Tour festival. Moulin made his first recording, the Jazz Goes Swinging LP, with The Saint-Tropez Jazz Octet (also known as Johnny Dover Octet) in 1969. Two years later, he formed the band Placebo with his close friend, guitar player Philip Catherine. Placebo recorded three albums (Ball of Eyes, 1973 and Placebo) and one 45 rpm single from 1973 until the group split up in 1976.

After Placebo disbanded, Moulin formed Telex with Michel Moers (vocals) and Dan Lacksman (synthesizer) in 1978 and his style shifted to electro pop. He also began working as producer for artists such as Lio, Michel Moers, Sparks, Philip Catherine, French crooner Alain Chamfort and left-field artists such as Anna Domino and Kid Montana. During the '80s, Moulin worked as a radio producer, appeared regularly on radio shows, and wrote for various Belgian publications, including Télémoustique.

Moulin died of throat cancer on 26 September 2008. He was 66 years old.

Discography

with Placebo 
1971 Ball of Eyes
1973 1973
1974 Placebo
1999 Placebo Sessions 1971–1974 (compilation)
2006 Placebo Years 1971–1974 (compilation)

Solo 
1975 Sam' Suffy
1986 Picnic
1992 Mæssage
2001 Top Secret
2004 Entertainment
2007 I Am You

Posthumous collections
2009 Bestof
2009 Bestof Restof
2009 Boxof
2013 Songs & Moods

Posthumous re-releases
2018 Placebo
2018 Placebo 1973
2018 Ball of Eyes
2018 Placebo Years Lost & Found

References

External links 
Homepage.
Marc Moulin interview

1942 births
2008 deaths
Belgian musicians
Belgian jazz musicians
Belgian pop musicians
Belgian electronic musicians
Belgian radio presenters
Belgian record producers
Deaths from esophageal cancer
Deaths from cancer in Belgium
21st-century Belgian musicians
20th-century Belgian musicians